Kilchrist Castle is a castle south west of Campbeltown, Argyll and Bute, Scotland. The castle was rebuilt in 1834 by Dugald McTavish, and is 3 storeys high with a corbelled parapet. The vaulted foundations of the castle are of unknown date.

References

Castles in Argyll and Bute